Statistics of Chinese Taipei National Football League in the 2004 season.

Overview
Taipower won the championship.

References
RSSSF

Chinese Taipei National Football League seasons
Chinese Taipei
Chinese Taipei
1